Events from the year 1942 in Canada.

Incumbents

Crown 
 Monarch – George VI

Federal government 
 Governor General – Alexander Cambridge, 1st Earl of Athlone
 Prime Minister – William Lyon Mackenzie King
 Chief Justice – Lyman Poore Duff (British Columbia)
 Parliament – 19th

Provincial governments

Lieutenant governors 
Lieutenant Governor of Alberta – John C. Bowen   
Lieutenant Governor of British Columbia – William Culham Woodward 
Lieutenant Governor of Manitoba – Roland Fairbairn McWilliams  
Lieutenant Governor of New Brunswick – William George Clark  
Lieutenant Governor of Nova Scotia – Frederick F. Mathers (until November 17) then Henry Ernest Kendall 
Lieutenant Governor of Ontario – Albert Edward Matthews 
Lieutenant Governor of Prince Edward Island – Bradford William LePage 
Lieutenant Governor of Quebec – Eugène Fiset 
Lieutenant Governor of Saskatchewan – Archibald Peter McNab

Premiers 
Premier of Alberta – William Aberhart    
Premier of British Columbia – John Hart  
Premier of Manitoba – John Bracken 
Premier of New Brunswick – John McNair 
Premier of Nova Scotia – A.S. MacMillan
Premier of Ontario – Mitchell Hepburn (until October 21) then Gordon Daniel Conant  
Premier of Prince Edward Island – Thane Campbell  
Premier of Quebec – Adélard Godbout 
Premier of Saskatchewan – William John Patterson

Territorial governments

Commissioners 
 Controller of Yukon – George A. Jeckell 
 Commissioner of Northwest Territories – Charles Camsell

Events
 January 10 – Elizabeth Monk and Suzanne Filion become the first female lawyers in Quebec
 February 10 – The  torpedoes and sinks , which had eight survivors.
 February 26 – Japanese Canadians are interned and moved further inland.
 April 27 – A national plebiscite is held on the issue of conscription. Most English-Canadians are in favour, while most French-Canadians are not.
 June 20 – The  shells the Estevan Point lighthouse on Vancouver Island.
 July – The Official Food Rules is published, for the first time.
 August – The National Resources Mobilization Act is repealed as a result of the April plebiscite.
Max Bernays will be awarded the Conspicuous Gallantry Medal for his actions in the battle.
 August 19 – Dieppe Raid
 September 7 – The  sinks  near Anticosti Island. All sailors aboard Racoon are killed.
 September 9 – The Canadian government establishes the Wartime Information Board, a government agency responsible for pro-conscription propaganda.
 September 11 – The  sinks  near Cap-Chat, Quebec, killing 9 out of the crew of 64.
 September 14 – The  sinks  in the North Atlantic, killing 114 sailors, with 69 surviving.
 October 14 – The  sinks the ferry  in the Gulf of St. Lawrence, killing 137. Margaret Brooke will be named a Member of the Order of the British Empire for her actions during the sinking.
 October 21 – Gordon Conant becomes premier of Ontario, replacing Mitchell Hepburn
 December 12 – The Knights of Columbus Hostel fire in St John's, Newfoundland, kills 99.

Sport 
April 18 – The Toronto Maple Leafs win their fourth Stanley Cup by defeating the Detroit Red Wings 4 games to 3 after being down to the Red Wings 3–0. The deciding Game 7 was played at Maple Leaf Gardens in Toronto
April 20 – The Manitoba Junior Hockey League's Portage la Prairie Terriers win their only Memorial Cup by defeating the Ontario Hockey Association's Oshawa Generals 3 games to 1. The deciding Game 4 was played at Shea's Amphitheatre in Winnipeg
December 5 – The Toronto RCAF Hurricanes win their only Grey Cup by defeating the Winnipeg RCAF Bombers 8 to 5 in the 30th Grey Cup played at Varsity Stadium in Toronto

Births

January to March
 January 12 - Hilary Weston, businessperson and 26th Lieutenant Governor of Ontario
 January 16 - René Angélil, husband and manager of Céline Dion
 January 19 - John Reynolds, politician
 February 5 - Tim Sale, politician
 February 19 - Norm Sterling, politician
 February 20 - Phil Esposito, ice hockey player
 February 22 - Gerard Jennissen, politician
 March 3 - Menaka Thakka, dancer

April to June
 April 8 - Harold Gilleshammer, politician
 April 10 - Nick Auf der Maur, journalist and politician (died 1998)
 April 21 - Pierre Lorrain, Canadian lawyer and politician (died 2004)
 April 22 - Sandra Birdsell, novelist and short story writer
 April 26 - Sharon Carstairs, politician and Senator
 May 1 - Becky Barrett, politician
 May 3 - Earl McRae, journalist (Ottawa Sun) (died 2011)
 May 8 - Pierre Morency, Canadian poet and playwright
 May 29 - Larry Mavety, ice hockey player and coach (died 2020)
 June 9 - John Gerretsen, politician
 June 10 - Preston Manning, politician
 June 15 - Ian Greenberg, media businessman (died 2022)
 June 21 - Jeannette Corbiere Lavell, Native rights advocate
 June 25 - Michel Tremblay, novelist and playwright

July to September
 July 1 - Geneviève Bujold, actress
 July 4 - Len Harapiak, politician
 July 11 - Terry Carisse, singer, guitarist, and songwriter (died 2005)
 July 11 - Nancy Zerg, poet
 July 22 - Anita Neville, politician
 July 24 - Gloria George, Native leader
 August 10 - Jim Downey, politician
 August 18 - Jim Abbott, politician
 August 24 - Gary Filmon, politician and 19th Premier of Manitoba
 August 24 - Tony Hunt, artist
 August 25 - Ivan Koloff, pro wrestler
 August 30 - Rick Salutin, novelist, playwright and critic
 September 4 - George Baker, politician and Senator
 September 13 - Michael Breaugh, politician (died 2019)
 September 13 - Michel Côté, businessman and politician
 September 20 - Gérald Tremblay, businessman and politician, 41st Mayor of Montreal

October to December

 October 10 - Roy Miki, poet and scholar
 October 11 - Dianne Brushett, politician
 November 1 - Ralph Klein, politician and 12th Premier of Alberta (died 2013)
 November 19 - Jim Ernst, politician
 November 20 - Raymond Bonin, politician
 December 1 - Charlie Penson, politician
 December 19 - John Godfrey, educator, journalist and politician
 December 30 - Matt Cohen, writer (died 1999)

Full date unknown
 Yves Lever, film critic and historian
 Dermot O'Reilly, musician, producer and songwriter (died 2007)
 Jay Roberts, football player, lung cancer (died 2010)

Deaths
 January 16 - Prince Arthur, Duke of Connaught and Strathearn, 10th Governor General of Canada (born 1850)
 January 30 - Frederick W. A. G. Haultain, politician and 1st Premier of the Northwest Territories (born 1857)
 February 4 - Louis-Adolphe Paquet, theologian (born 1859)
 March 11 - Raoul Dandurand, politician (born 1861)
 March 15 - Edgar Nelson Rhodes, politician, Minister and Premier of Nova Scotia (born 1877)
 March 21 - J. S. Woodsworth, politician (born 1874)
 April 24 - Lucy Maud Montgomery, author (born 1874)
 May 18 - Herménégilde Boulay, politician (born 1861)
 June 17 - Charles Fitzpatrick, lawyer, politician and 5th Chief Justice of Canada (born 1853)
 October 6 - Ella Cora Hind, journalist and women's rights activist (born 1861)
 December 26 - Frank Dawson Adams, geologist (born 1859)

See also
 List of Canadian films

Historical documents
Canadian Press reporter's landing craft "under intense Nazi fire" from boats, planes and infantry at Dieppe

Official study details objectives, heroism and failures of combined commando raid on Dieppe, France

Canadian soldier in Dieppe raid describes prisoner-of-war camp life in Germany

Painting: portrait of Indigenous soldier Lloyd George Moore, Royal Canadian Artillery

"Considerable excitement and tension" -  rams U-boat while on convoy duty in Caribbean Sea

Pubnico, Nova Scotia children salvage flour, cigarettes and candy bars from torpedoed freighters in harbour

"Blasted from a cosy state room to a cold, icy water" - Survivors' tales of torpedoed Sydney–to–Port-aux-Basques ferry Caribou

Illustration: U.S. Coast Guard rescues Canadian fliers from Greenland ice shelf

To maintain status quo with Vichy France, Allies manoeuvre to get Free French forces off St. Pierre and Miquelon

Minister of Finance says Canadians not working for themselves or their families, but for victory

In U.S. government profile of Allies, Canada noted for contributions like 2 billion pounds of food and "54% of everyone's income"

"Has Canada fully mobilized her material resources [and] man and woman power to wage total war?" - Opposition Leader's 7-point plan

Federal agriculture minister James Gardiner lists supports and goals for producers, and praises farm men, women and children

PM King broadcasts enhanced plan of men's, women's and youth's service to achieve "total effort for total war"

Women's Land Army members work on farms and socialize with Canadian soldiers in Sussex, England

In House of Commons debate, Minister of National Defence J.L. Ralston addresses total war policy and conscription

"The most sacred understanding" - PM King asks voters for release from pledge of no conscription for overseas military service

Canadians vote "yes" in conscription plebiscite by large majorities in 8 provinces, with strong "no" in Quebec

"A systemic policy of annihilation" - Zionist congress of Switzerland reports millions of Jews killed

"Defensive measures of the racial brotherhood" - "Final Solution" should include sterilization of "half-Jews"

Eviction from coastal British Columbia creates many social problems for people of Japanese origin

Young interned Japanese Canadians seek pen pals to "sling some ink our way"

Japanese Canadian George Tanaka experiences feeling of freedom in Toronto, along with both sympathy and racism

Canadian diplomat in Washington strongly suspects U.S. government is eavesdropping on his communications

Drills and training part of Manitoba's Air Raid Precaution campaign, though federal government calls it unnecessary

As part of Victory Bonds campaign, Winnipeg stages "If Day" mock German invasion including arrest of premier and mayor

Film: newsreel report on If Day in Winnipeg

"Death and Destruction!" - Victory Bonds promotion page shows Hamilton, Ont. after bomber attack

Hamilton hydro commission prohibits commercial and decorative lighting, and dims street lights to 60%

"Environments created by war foster dangerous inclinations and tendencies" - PM King urges temperance as part of war effort

"Prophet of a new idea" - Journalist Bruce Hutchison's tribute to late CCF leader and co-founder J.S. Woodsworth

"There is work for everyone" - Whitehorse, Yukon transformed by industrial development

Wife of U.S. Army general enjoys settling in Whitehorse (Note: "squaw" and rape mentioned)

Brief film of Alberta oil sands being quarried and refined

After three decades and 1.6 billion feet of lumber cut, Fort Frances, Ont. mill closes with banquet and dance for employees

Future Netherlands queen Juliana's Ottawa maternity suite declared outside Canadian jurisdiction for birth of her third child

References

 
Years of the 20th century in Canada
Canada
1942 in North America
1940s in Canada